The 1898 Paris–Roubaix was the third edition of the Paris–Roubaix, a classic one-day cycle race in France. The single day event was held on 10 April 1898 and stretched  from Paris to its end in a velodrome in Roubaix. The winner was Maurice Garin, an Italian living in France.

Results

References

Paris–Roubaix
Paris–Roubaix
Paris–Roubaix
Paris–Roubaix